The Emperor's Nightingale is a 1949 Czechoslovak stop-motion animated film directed by Jiří Trnka and Miloš Makovec. The film is based on the 1843 fairy tale "The Nightingale" by Hans Christian Andersen. Boris Karloff provides the voice of the narrator in the 1951 American dubbed version. The film won the Golden Leopard at the Locarno International Film Festival.

In the film, a live-action boy dreams that his toys are real. The toys come to life in stop-motion animation, and tell the story of a Chinese emperor who makes friends with a nightingale.

Cast
 Helena Patočková as the girl
 Jaromír Sobota as the boy
 Dětský pěvecký sbor Jana Kuhna as chorus
 Boris Karloff - Narrator in English language version only

See also
 Boris Karloff filmography
 List of Czech films
 Jiří Trnka

References

External links

1949 animated films
1949 films
Czechoslovak animated films
1940s Czech-language films
Films based on works by Hans Christian Andersen
Films directed by Jiří Trnka
Golden Leopard winners
Czech animated films
Czech fantasy films
Films with screenplays by Jiří Brdečka
1940s fantasy films
Works based on The Nightingale (fairy tale)
Films based on fairy tales